Steve Komphela (born 1 July 1967) is a South African football coach and a former player. He is the former manager of Maritzburg United, Kaizer Chiefs, Golden 
Arrows and Bloemfontein Celtic. He is currently working as a Senior Coach at Mamelodi Sundowns and he has been credited for his good work at Mamelodi Sundowns.

Early life
Steve was born in Golden Valley farm, 20 km outside Kroonstad to Jack Koyi Koyo and Nomalanga Komphela as the youngest of 11 children. Politician Butana Komphela is his brother. Komphela became a teacher by profession after he got his teacher's diploma at Tshiya College in Free State.

Club career
Komphela started out at NSL Second Division side Klerksdorp City and later Qwa Qwa Stars where he earned promotion to the National Soccer League. He made his NSL debut on 9 February 1986 in a 4–1 win over Witbank Aces. In 1992, Komphela helped his team to a third-place finish in the league and was voted the NSL Players' Player of the Year. He later joined Kaizer Chiefs where he played all 34 league games and signed a contract overseas on 16 August 1993 moving to Gaziantepspor for the second half of 1993/94 season alongside fellow South African Tebogo Moloi. He retired in 1997.

Outside football
Komphela is married to Mamoepi Komphela, and together they have three kids: Nombuyiselo, Nomalanga, and Noxolo. He taught at the Johannesburg Secondary School but apart from being a life orientation teacher and a professional footballer, Komphela was also a TV presenter. He hosted his own talk show on television channel Canakkale Dardanelspor AS.
Komphela was approached by SABC to be the host of a football talk show but rejected this opportunity. Steve also tutors the Mamelodi Sundowns youth team. He said the youth need brains to play football because "without brains a footballer is just a headless chicken chasing a ball". He also takes part in many youth uplifting programs.

International career
Komphela is a founder member of the new national team of South Africa. He made his debut on 7 July 1992 in a 1–0 win over Cameroon. On 24 October 1992 against Congo, his 7th cap, he captained the team in its second World Cup qualifier. He played every minute of the first 22 internationals. He captained the team for the 18th and last time in a 2–2 draw against Zambia on 22 November 1995 which was his 24th cap. Having played almost half of the team's internationals up to December 1995. He was not selected for the 1996 African Cup of Nations for obvious reasons.

Coaching career
Kompela began his coaching career with Manning Rangers F.C. in 2002. Between 2002 and 2015, he coached several clubs, in which he all worked for a single season. In 2015, he joined Kaizer Chiefs F.C. for a three-year contract. He did not win any trophy since his arrival at Kaizer Chiefs and was forced to resign before the end of his contract. This followed after Kaizer Chief's fans launched violent protests against him in every match. In July 2018, he joined Bloemfontein Celtic which was undergoing financial struggles at the time.

Shortly after he started his new career with Bloemfontein Celtic, he started the 2018-19 Premier Soccer League league with a huge surprise. He won the first six consecutive league games and got a 2–2 draw against Kaizer Chiefs, after which his team was down to 2–0 at one point later in the second-half. He also beat Orlando Pirates in that first leg of the season. He managed Golden Arrows but resigned a day before he was announced as the new Mamelodi Sundowns coach. He was announced to coach Mamelodi Sundowns on the club's Twitter on Monday 12 October 2020.

References

1967 births
Living people
South African soccer players
South Africa international soccer players
South African expatriate soccer players
Kaizer Chiefs F.C. players
Gaziantepspor footballers
Dardanelspor footballers
Süper Lig players
Expatriate footballers in Turkey
Association football defenders
South Africa national soccer team managers
Maritzburg United F.C. managers
Free State Stars F.C. managers
Platinum Stars F.C. managers
Dynamos F.C. (South Africa) managers
South African soccer managers